Fotbal Club Ripensia Timișoara, commonly known as Ripensia Timișoara, or simply as Ripensia, is a Romanian professional football club based in Timișoara, Timiș County. It plays in the Liga II.

The team was founded in 1928 by Lázár Kornél and folded after twenty years due to lack of funds. However, Ripi was brought back to life and enrolled in the Liga VI, the sixth tier of the Romanian football league system, in 2012.

Ripensia Timișoara was the first Romanian club to turn professional, and because of this status they were unable to compete in the national league until the 1932–33 season. After being granted permission in the national system, the club soon became one of the best in the country, winning four national titles and two national cups in their short history.

The colors of the team are red and yellow.

History

It was founded in 1928 by Lázár Kornél, a famous promoter of football in the Banat region, and the former president of Chinezul Timișoara. The players came from Chinezul Timișoara, C.A.T. and Poli Timișoara. Vilmos Kertész coached the team from 1931 to 1932. Due to its professional status, until 1932–1933 (the first season of the National League – Divizia A), the team and its players could not participate in official national competitions.

They were champions of the Romanian Football League in 1933, 1935, 1936, and 1938, with two Romanian Cup appearances, winning 3–2 over Universitatea Cluj in 1934 and 5–1 over Unirea Tricolor București in 1936. They were national vice-champions for 1933–34 and 1938–39. After World War II, due to financial problems, the communist sports organisation and controversial actions, Ripensia played in Divizia B and Divizia C. After 1948, without any support, it disappeared, merging with Electrica Timișoara.
Their colours were red-yellow. Their home stadium was called Electrica (today UMT; the original wooden stand was demolished in 2004–2005).
The greatest players in team history were:
Goalkeepers: Vilmos Zombori, Dumitru Pavlovici
Defenders: Rudolf Bürger, Balázs Hoksary
Midfielders: Vasile Chiroiu II, Vasile Deheleanu, Rudolf Kotormány, Eugen Lakatos, Nicolae Simatoc
Forwards: Gheorghe Oprean, Zoltán Beke, Silviu Bindea, Gheorghe Ciolac, Ştefan Dobay, Ladislau Raffinski, Sándor Schwartz, Graţian Sepi II, Mihai Tänzer, Adalbert Marksteiner
In the 2012 the team was reestablished and competed in the municipal championship, they won it and promoted to Liga V. In Liga V they reached the first place in the 2013–2014 season and promoted to the next league Liga IV. Also they made a good impression in the 2013–14 Romanian Cup, where they defeated again Universitatea Cluj to reach the Last 16 of the cup making them the surprise of the cup. In the Last 16 they lost to Pandurii Târgu Jiu.

In the 2014–15 Liga IV season, Ripi had a very tough opponent, in the position of ASU Politehnica Timișoara, the fan-owned phoenix club formed after the dissolution of FC Politehnica Timișoara by its fans and finished only on the 2nd place.

Next season Ripensia had a perfect journey, won Liga IV – Timiș County and qualified for the promotion play-offs to Liga III. At the promotion play-off Ripensia met the champion of Hunedoara County, Hercules Lupeni, and they won without major difficulties, 7–0 on aggregate, thus ensuring promotion to the Liga III.

2016–17 Liga III season was the first one for Ripi in the last over 60 years. The team had a very close fight for supremacy in the Seria IV against CSM Școlar Reșița, CSM Lugoj, Cetate Deva and Național Sebiș but in the end they won and promoted to Liga II after an absence of 69 years.

Honours

Domestic

Leagues
Liga I
Winners (4): 1932–33, 1934–35, 1935–36, 1937–38
Runners-up (2): 1933–34, 1938–39
Liga III
Winners (2): 1946–47, 2016–17
Liga IV – Timiș County
Winners (1): 2015–16
Runners-up (1): 2014–15
Liga V – Timiș County
Winners (1): 2013–14
Liga VI – Timiș County
Winners (1): 2012–13

Cups
Cupa României
Winners (2): 1933–34, 1935–36
Runners-up (2): 1934–35, 1936–37

Players

First-team squad

Out on loan

Club officials

Board of directors

Current technical staff

Former players
The footballers enlisted below have had international cap(s) for their respective countries at junior and/or senior level.

Romania
  Zoltan Beke
  Silviu Bindea
  Rudolf Bürger
  Vasile Chiroiu
  Gheorghe Ciolac
  Sever Coracu
  Vasile Deheleanu
  Ștefan Dobay
  Andrei Glanzmann
  Balázs Hoksary
  Rudolf Kotormány
  Ștefan Kovács
  Eugen Lakatos
  József Moravetz
  Dumitru Pavlovici
  László Raffinsky
  Alexandru Schwartz
  Augustin Semler
  Grațian Sepi
  Nicolae Simatoc
  Iosif Slivăț
  Rudolf Wetzer
  Vilmos Zombori

Hungary
 Ferenc Plattkó

Romania-Hungary
  Nicolae Kovács
  Adalbert Marksteiner
  Mihai Tänzer

Former managers

Romania
 Rudolf Bürger
 Paul Codrea
 Rudolf Wetzer

Hungary
 Vilmos Kertész
 Jenő Konrád

Austria
 Josef Uridil

Domestic records and statistics

Key

 Pos = Final position
 P = Played
 W = Games won
 D = Games drawn
 L = Games lost
 GF = Goals For
 GA = Goals Against
 Pts = Points

 Div A / L1 = Liga I
 Div B / L2 = Liga II
 Div C / L3 = Liga III
 L4 = Liga IV
 L5 = Liga V
 L6 = Liga VI
 p = Preliminary Round
 1R = Round 1
 2R = Round 2

 3R = Round 3
 4R = Round 4
 5R = Round 5
 GS = Group stage
 R32 = Round of 32
 QF = Quarter-finals
 R16 = Round of 16
 SF = Semi-finals
 F = Final

The players in bold were the top goalscorers in the division.

Seasons

European record

Mitropa Cup
Ripensia played in the Mitropa Cup, an important inter-war football competition. In the 1938 season Ripensia knocked Italian giants AC Milan out of this competition. The Romanians won the first leg 3–0 at Bucharest, and lost the second leg 1–3. In the next round Ripensia was eliminated by Hungarian side of Ferencváros (1–4, 4–5).

References

External links

Official website
 Club profile on UEFA's official website

 
Association football clubs established in 1928
Football clubs in Timiș County
Sport in Timișoara
Liga I clubs
Liga II clubs
Liga III clubs
Liga IV clubs
1928 establishments in Romania